Perumpuliyur  is a village in the Thiruvaiyaru taluk of Thanjavur district in Tamil Nadu, India. The village is known for the Vyagrapureeswarar Temple.

Demographics 

As per the 2001 census, Senganur had a population of 1,258 with 619 males and 639 females. The sex ratio was 1,032 and the literacy rate, 80.13.

References 

 

Villages in Thanjavur district